Hickory Grove is an unincorporated community in Carroll County, Illinois, United States. Hickory Grove is located on a railroad line southeast of Savanna.

References

Unincorporated communities in Carroll County, Illinois
Unincorporated communities in Illinois